These 127 genera belong to the family Platystomatidae, signal flies. There are at least 1,100 described species in Platystomatidae.

Platystomatidae genera

 Achias Fabricius, 1805 c g
 Aetha McAlpine, 2001 c g
 Agadasys Whittington, 2000 c g
 Aglaioptera Frey, 1964 c g
 Agrochira Enderlein, 1911 c g
 Amphicnephes Loew, 1873
 Angelopteromyia Korneyev, 2001 c g
 Angitula Walker, 1859 c g
 Antineura Osten Sacken, 1881 c g
 Apactoneura Malloch, 1930 c g
 Apiola McAlpine, 1973 c g
 Asyntona Osten Sacken, 1881 c g
 Atopocnema Enderlein, 1922 c g
 Atopognathus Bigot, 1881 c g
 Bama McAlpine, 2001 c g
 Boisduvalia Robineau-Desvoidy, 1830 c g
 Brea Walker, 1859 c g
 Bromophila Loew, 1873
 Carolimyia Malloch, 1931
 Chaetorivellia de Meijere, 1913 c g
 Cladoderris Bezzi, 1914 c g
 Cleitamia Macquart, 1835 c g
 Cleitamoides Malloch, 1939 c g
 Clitodoca Loew, 1873
 Coelocephala Karsch, 1888 c g
 Conicipithea Hendel, 1912 c g
 Conopariella Enderlein, 1922 c g
 Dayomyia McAlpine, 2007 c g
 Duomyia Walker, 1849 c g
 Elassogaster Bigot, 1860 c g
 Engistoneura Loew, 1873
 Eopiara Frey, 1964
 Eosamphicnephes Frey, 1932 c g
 Eudasys Whittington, 2003 c g
 Eumeka McAlpine, 2001 c g
 Euprosopia Macquart, 1847 c g
 Eurypalpus Macquart, 1835 c g
 Euthyplatystoma Hendel, 1914 c g
 Euxestomoea Meijere, 1913 c g
 Federleyella Frey, 1932 c g
 Furcamyia Whittington, 2003 c g
 Guamomyia Malloch, 1942 c g
 Himeroessa Loew, 1873
 Hysma McAlpine, 2001 c g
 Icteracantha Hendel, 1912 c g
 Imugana Enderlein, 1937 c g
 Inium McAlpine, 1995 c g
 Laglaizia Bigot, 1878 c g
 Lambia Hendel, 1914 c g
 Lamprogaster Macquart, 1843 c g
 Lamprophthalma Portschinsky, 1892 c g
 Lenophila Guérin-Méneville, 1843 c g
 Lophoplatystoma Hendel, 1914 c g
 Loxoceromyia Hendel, 1914 c g
 Loxoneura Macquart, 1835 c g
 Loxoneuroides Hendel, 1914 c g
 Lule Speiser, 1910 c g
 Lulodes Enderlein, 1924 c g
 Meringomeria Enderlein, 1924
 Mesanopin Enderlein, 1912
 Mesoctenia Enderlein, 1924 c g
 Metoposparga Enderlein, 1924 c g
 Mezona Speiser, 1910 c g
 Microepicausta Hendel, 1914 c g
 Micronesomyia Whittington, 2003 c g
 Mindanaia Malloch, 1931 c g
 Montrouziera Bigot, 1860 c g
 Naupoda Osten Sacken, 1881 c g
 Neoardelio Hendel, 1914 c g
 Neoepidesma Hendel, 1914 c g
 Neohemigaster Malloch, 1939 c g
 Oeciotypa Hendel, 1914 c g
 Oedemachilus Bigot, 1860 c g
 Palpomya Robineau-Desvoidy, 1830 c g
 Par McAlpine, 2001 c g
 Parardelio Hendel, 1912 c g
 Paryphodes Speiser, 1911 c g
 Peltacanthina Enderlein, 1912 c g
 Peronotrochus Enderlein, 1924
 Phasiamya Walker, 1849 c g
 Philocompus Osten Sacken, 1881 c g
 Phlebophis Frey, 1932 c g
 Phlyax McAlpine, 2001 c g
 Phytalmodes Bezzi & Bezzi, 1908 c g
 Piara Loew, 1873
 Picrometopus Frey, 1930 c g
 Plagiostenopterina Hendel, 1912 c g
 Plastotephritis Enderlein, 1922 c g
 Platystoma Meigen, 1803 c g b
 Poecilotraphera Hendel, 1914 c g
 Pogonortalis Hendel, 1911 i c g b
 Polystodes Robineau-Desvoidy, 1830 c g
 Prosopoconus Enderlein, 1922 c g
 Prosthiochaeta Enderlein, 1924 c g
 Pseudepicausta Hendel, 1912 c g
 Pseudocleitamia Malloch, 1939 c g
 Pseudorichardia Hendel, 1911 c g
 Pseudoscholastes Frey, 1932
 Pterogenia Bigot, 1859 c g
 Pterogenomyia Hendel, 1914 c g
 Rhegmatosaga Frey, 1930 c g
 Rhytidortalis Hendel, 1914 c g
 Rivellia Robineau-Desvoidy, 1830 i c g b
 Scelostenopterina Hendel, 1914 c g
 Scholastes Loew, 1873
 Scotinosoma Loew, 1873
 Seguyopiara Steyskal, 1990 c g
 Senopterina Macquart, 1835 i c g b
 Signa McAlpine, 2001 c g
 Sors McAlpine, 2007 c g
 Sphenoprosopa Loew, 1873
 Stellapteryx Whittington, 2003 c g
 Steyskaliella Soós, 1978 c g
 Tarfa McAlpine, 2001 c g
 Terzia McAlpine, 2001 c g
 Tomeus McAlpine, 2001 c g
 Traphera Loew, 1873
 Trigonosoma Gray, 1832 c g
 Valonia Walker, 1856 c g
 Venacalva Whittington, 2003 c g
 Xenaspis Osten Sacken, 1881 c g
 Xenaspoides Frey, 1930 c g
 Xiria Walker, 1856 c g
 Xiriella Frey, 1964
 Xyrogena Whittington, 2003 c g
 Zealandortalis Malloch, 1930 c g
 Zygaenula Doleschall, 1858 c g

Data sources: i = ITIS, c = Catalogue of Life, g = GBIF, b = Bugguide.net

References